Kevät is an album by Finnish a cappella ensemble Rajaton, released in 2005.  The word kevät means "spring" in Finnish. This album is decidedly different from the previous, more traditional albums by Rajaton. In each of the songs, one member acts as the soloist with the other five as back up (except for Nälkäiset Linnut, which features two leads). The album peaked at number three in the Finnish charts and was certified gold within six weeks of release.

Track listing
Track (Composer), Soloist
Kivinen Tie, Soila Sariola
Lunta (Teemu Brunila), Ahti Paunu
Älä Mene Pois (Mia Makaroff), Essi Wuorela
Kertosäkeen Nainen (Ufo Mustonen), Jussi Chydenius
Venelaulu (Markku Reinikainen), Soila Sariola
Sydän Ei Vastaa (Jarkko Kuoppamäki), Hannu Lepola
Jos Sanot (Timo Kiiskinen), Essi Wuorela
Nälkäiset Linnut (music by Jussi Chydenius, words by Heikki Salo), Essi Wuorela and Hannu Lepola
Kauniimpaa (music by Teemu Brunila and Hannu Korkeamäki, words by Teemu Brunila), Virpi Moskari
Katosimme Kauneuteen (Kalle Chydenius), Hannu Lepola
Hopeaa Hiuksillaan (Tommi Lattunen), Essi Wuorela

External links
 official Rajaton website
 Rajaton - Kevät at Last.fm

Rajaton albums